Diego Ferney Chará Zamora (born April 5, 1986) is a Colombian professional footballer who plays for Major League Soccer club Portland Timbers.

Career

Club
Chará began his career in the youth ranks of Deportes Quindío. In 2004, he moved up to the senior side and became an important player for Quindío. The talented midfielder made 124 league appearances and scored 2 goals while with Quindío. As a result of his play he began to draw the attention of the top clubs in Colombia and in 2009 joined América de Cali. In one year with America Chará made 31 league appearances and scored 1 goal. The following season, he joined Deportes Tolima and was a key player in his club's run to the quarterfinal of the 2010 Copa Sudamericana. The following season, he helped Tolima qualify to the 2011 Copa Libertadores. During the 2011 Copa Libertadores Chará appeared in seven games, and provided an assist in a 2-0 win over Brazilian power Corinthians in the early stages of the tournament.

As a result of his play during the Copa Libertadores run Chará started to receive interest from Major League Soccer side Portland Timbers. In April 2011, Chará signed with Portland and became the club's first ever Designated Player. On August 20, he scored his first goal in Major League Soccer after just 78 seconds of the home match against Cascadia Cup rivals Vancouver Whitecaps FC. It broke the record for the fastest MLS goal for the club.

Chará became the second Major League Soccer player to record more than 30,000 minutes for a single club on March 19, 2023 in a 5–1 loss to Atlanta United.

International
Chará has been capped twice for the Colombia national team. Chará played his first game for Colombia on November 18, 2010 in a friendly match against Peru.

Personal
Chará's older brother, Felipe Chará, and his younger brother, Yimmi Chará are also professional footballers. Yimmi currently also plays for Portland Timbers, officially signing on January 2, 2020.

Chará became a naturalized United States citizen in August 2019. Before that, he held a U.S. green card which qualified him as a domestic player for MLS roster purposes.

Career statistics

Club

International

Honours
Portland Timbers
MLS Cup: 2015
MLS is Back Tournament: 2020
Western Conference (playoffs): 2015, 2018, 2021
Western Conference (regular season): 2013, 2017

Individual
MLS All-Star: 2019
MLS Best XI: 2020

References

External links
 
 
 

1986 births
Living people
América de Cali footballers
Association football midfielders
Categoría Primera A players
Colombia international footballers
Colombian expatriate footballers
Colombian expatriate sportspeople in the United States
Colombian footballers
Deportes Quindío footballers
Deportes Tolima footballers
Designated Players (MLS)
Expatriate soccer players in the United States
Major League Soccer players
Portland Timbers players
Footballers from Cali
Portland Timbers 2 players
USL Championship players